The Crazy Ones is an American television sitcom created by David E. Kelley, and starring Robin Williams and Sarah Michelle Gellar. The single-camera series aired for one season on CBS, from September 26, 2013, to April 17, 2014. It was part of the 2013–14 American television season as a Thursday night 9:00 pm Eastern / 8:00 pm Central entry. Bill D'Elia, Dean Lorey, and Jason Winer served as executive producers for 20th Century Fox Television. The episodes are loosely based on the life experiences of John R. Montgomery while he worked at Leo Burnett advertising in Chicago.

On October 18, 2013, CBS gave the show a full-season order. On February 27, 2014, the series switched timeslots with Two and a Half Men and started airing at 9:30 pm Eastern / 8:30 pm Central. CBS canceled the series on May 10, 2014, marking Williams' final television role nearly three months before his death on August 11, 2014.

Production
The series was created by David E. Kelley, who had previously created the television series Picket Fences, Chicago Hope, The Practice, Ally McBeal, Boston Public, Boston Legal, and Harry's Law. It starred Robin Williams as Simon Roberts, an executive at the Chicago advertising agency Lewis, Roberts, and Roberts, who worked with his tightly wound daughter and protégée, Sydney, played by Sarah Michelle Gellar. The series represented Williams's first series regular role since Mork & Mindy 31 years earlier, and the first series for Gellar since Ringer, which was cancelled by The CW in 2012 after one season. Williams's part was written with him in mind. When Gellar learned that Williams was making a television comedy, she contacted her friend Sarah de Sa Rego, the wife of Williams's best friend, Bobcat Goldthwait, to lobby for a co-starring role.

The series was filmed on Soundstages of 12, 11, and 14 at the 20th Century Fox studios in Los Angeles, which had previously housed the production for the medical drama House.

Actual big-brand names were referenced in episodes to evoke a sense of realism, though the companies that owned the brands did not pay for this, nor did they get script approval. In the pilot, singer Kelly Clarkson performed a modified version of the McDonald's slogan "You deserve a break today".

Cast

Main
Robin Williams as Simon Roberts, a Chicago advertising executive: Robin Williams described Simon as "a guy who can sell anything. He could sell frappuccinos to Starbucks. He could sell clouds to God." Touching upon how his own life was the inspiration for Simon's backstory, Williams said, "Simon's a guy with a lot of nuance. He's lived hard and been on the edge for a long time. Multiple marriages, rehab, even rehab in wine country. Trust me, I've done the research myself."  During the time since Simon was divorced by Sydney's mom, he has been married several times, and genuinely wants to be a part of his daughter's life. He adds Sydney to the executive partnership after she improves his business and adds her name to the agency before the start of the series.
Sarah Michelle Gellar as Sydney Roberts: Simon's daughter is also a business partner and director at the ad agency. Her character often played the "straight woman" to Simon's plans; raised by her mother after Simon was divorced, she does not fault him for being more involved with work than his family. Despite this, Sydney often uses her past growing up as justification for her business decisions. She has romantic feelings for her best friend, Andrew, but she chooses not to date him, as she values their friendship more and is concerned about the consequences of a break-up.
James Wolk as Zach Cropper, a copywriter: He is a charismatic but shallow womanizer who does not know much about the advertising business. He has an on again/off again physical relationship with Lauren. His colleagues and he often use good looks as an additional advantage in getting clients. Zach enjoys a natural camaraderie with Simon, often bouncing ideas off of each other and brainstorming together. 
Hamish Linklater as Andrew Keanelly, an art director: Andrew is well-spoken, smart, and often on Sydney's side as the other voice of reason among the staff at their agency. He has a sarcastic, "down-to-earth" personality in contrast to Zach's occasional overconfidence. Andrew also suffers from a lack of confidence, as a part of a larger rural-based family (he refers himself to being "one of seven sisters"). He has a crush on Sydney, who reciprocates these feelings, but is hesitant to start a relationship with him, so respects her wishes to stay friends.
Amanda Setton as Lauren Slotsky, an assistant: Lauren usually comes across as dim-witted, but is described as "much smarter than she first appears", with a vast knowledge of sharks and talent in poetry. She is bisexual as she occasionally likes to date with both men and women.

Recurring
Brad Garrett as Gordon Lewis, Simon's business partner: Gordon works on a different floor with accounts. Gordon is Simon's opposite: professional, restrained, and critical of Simon's decisions. Because of this, the two partners tend to share a frenemy relationship. Gordon is also gay, with a boyfriend, Timothy (Jonathan Del Arco).
Josh Groban as Danny Chase, Sydney's former co-worker: He is obsessed with her and writes a song about his unrequited love for her, which he released as a single. Upon its release, he sent a copy to Sydney. Sydney panics, believing him to be a stalker, and ends her relationship with him. The agency ends up licensing the song for an ad about Australia and also worked with him on a campaign for barbecue sauce.
Fred Melamed as himself, a voice-over artist who is frequently at odds over the direction of his career
Tiya Sircar as Allie, Sydney's assistant, who is hired near the end of the series: She dates Andrew before he breaks up with her per Sydney's wishes. However, after Allie is heartbroken by the breakup, Andrew gets back together with her, after Sydney asks him to "fix" her. In the final episodes of the show, however, Sydney gets jealous as the two date, and kisses Andrew at the end of the series finale.

Episodes

Reception
The show received mixed reviews from critics. The first season received a score of 58 out of 100 on Metacritic, indicating "mixed or average reviews".

Morgan Jeffery of Digital Spy wrote that "Williams can't resist falling back on his old bag of tricks on occasion – cartoon voices, gurning, rambling wordplay – but there's a decent amount of pathos to his performance as part-buffoon, part-genius Simon Roberts too and the comedy veteran shares a warm, genuine chemistry with his on-screen offspring Gellar." Rob Owen of the Pittsburgh Post-Gazette wrote, "Whether The Crazy Ones can come together as a series over time remains an open question, but the pilot offers enough charm and humor to warrant future consideration."

The Washington Post wrote that the pilot "leaves you wanting more", and gave the pilot a grade of B−.  According to Ross Bonaime of Paste, "I don’t know how it does it, but The Crazy Ones continues to be one of the most boring comedies with one of the most amazing casts on the air today."  He continues to say "The entire show is just treading on 'meh.' It also feels like this show just exists in a vacuum, with nothing in any prior episode really having an effect on anything that comes after it. There are no continuing story arcs, nor any real characters to really bond with." The Boston Herald gave the show a negative review, noting that "Williams seems exhausted."
The 'pilot' episode's positive reviews were also for guest star Kelly Clarkson; website 'ET Online' claimed she was a 'front runner' for an Emmy nomination in 2014 for Guest Actress in a Comedy Series.
Website 'Gold Derby' said that the lack of Golden Globe nominations for the show, for Best Comedy, Lead Actress (for Gellar) and Lead Actor (for Williams) was a 'snub'.

David E. Kelley became particularly critical of the show and said: "The show wasn’t very good. It started off with great ratings, but after watching three or four episodes, I thought the storytelling was pretty bad... Robin Williams was great... but the stories made me want to hold my nose.”

Sarah Michelle Gellar loved the show: “I loved that show. I could have done it for five or seven years and seen my kids grow up.”

Ratings
The premiere episode garnered 15.52 million viewers, making the show the highest viewed premiere in fall 2013. Its 18-49 rating (3.9/11) is also the highest rated new comedy premiere rating of the season. With the Live + 3 days DVR numbers, the Pilot added +22% viewers gathering 18.98 million viewers and a 6.8 adults 25–54 rating with 5.1 in adults 18–49. During the 2013-2014 season, the show's ratings fell, with its season finale garnering only 5.23 million viewers. On May 10, 2014, CBS announced it had cancelled The Crazy Ones.

Awards and nominations

Home media

On April 7, 2015, the series became available on a 3-disc DVD set via Amazon.com's DVD-R On-Demand Service, containing all 22 episodes.

References

External links

2010s American single-camera sitcoms
2013 American television series debuts
2014 American television series endings
2010s American workplace comedy television series
CBS original programming
English-language television shows
Television series about the media
Television series by 20th Century Fox Television
Television shows set in Chicago
Television series about advertising
Television series created by David E. Kelley